Władysław Godik (Willy Godik, Godick, Godnick, Vladislav Godik) (April 1, 1892 – December 18, 1952) was a Polish Jewish singer, actor and director in Polish, Russian, and Yiddish theatre. Born in Zlatopil near Kyiv, Ukraine, he moved with his family to Warsaw, where he did two semesters in the veterinarian institute.

He acted in the dramatic section of Hazemir and in 1911 he began acting professionally at Gershanovitsh in Vitebsk, playing Baynushl in Pintele Yid. During the First World War he took part in Krutshinin's Russian operettas and later some German operettas. In 1909 he appeared in Radom in Tsharnetski's Polish Operetta troupe, and played in Shulamis, then founded a Polish-language revue theater called Mirage. Half a year later he joined Zygmunt Turkow and Ester Rachel Kamińska's traveling troupe. He played for four years at the Central Theater and spent one year in Vilna with Morevski.

Between 1920-1928 he appeared at the Habima Theatre. He became renowned as a conferencier (Master of Ceremonies). In 1918 he returned to Poland and in 1925 he convinced his wife, Ola Lilith, to join him in founding the "Yiddish Kleynkunst Theater Azazel". He was conferencier of the combined Azazel - Sambatiyon theater revue in 1928 and performed with the Warsaw Yiddish Art Theater (Varshever Yidisher Kunst-teater; VYKT). In 1931 he and Lilith debuted in America, in recitals and in The Girl from Warsaw. He returned with Lilith to Poland; she returned to America in 1935. In 1939 he fled the Nazis by entering the Soviet Union through Białystok.

In 1942 Godik joined the Red Army. He was wounded in battle; after recovering he performed in Moscow, after 1944 in the Polish Army Theatre in Lodz; from 1946 until his death he acted at the Polish Theatre in Warsaw, where he died in 1952.

Filmography
Tkies khaf (1924)
Border Street (1948)

References

1892 births
1952 deaths
Jewish cabaret performers
Polish cabaret performers
19th-century Polish Jews
Yiddish theatre performers
20th-century comedians